Pilsupiai (formerly) is a village in Kėdainiai district municipality, in Kaunas County, in central Lithuania. According to the 2011 census, the village had a population of 54 people.

There is the Pilsupiai hillfort (Bakanas' hill) on the confluence of the rivers. Nearby, a nature monument the Piluspiai outcrop is located on the shore of the Angiriai Reservoir.  away from Pilsupiai, at the former Skinderiškis estate place the Skinderiškis Dendrological Park is located.

History
Pilsupiai village is known since 1596. The first primary school was established here at the end of the 19th century.

Demography

Images

References

Villages in Kaunas County
Kėdainiai District Municipality